Toxic Garden (formerly known as Limit) is a steel roller coaster located at Heide Park, Germany. It opened in 1999 and is a standard 689m layout Suspended Looping Coaster manufactured by Vekoma. In March 2023, Heide Park announced that Limit would be renamed to Toxic Garden, with new thematic elements and a partial replacement of the ride's track.

Ride experience

The ride starts with a 109.3ft to the top of the lift hill. Next the ride drops 91ft down a banked drop reaching speeds of 49.7 m.p.h. The train then immediately navigates a rollover (2 Half loops connected by two half heartline rolls). Once the train exits the rollover it then navigates a banked turn, sidewinder, helix and transitions into a double in-line twist. The train then performs a few turns and into the brake run.

Colour scheme
Toxic Garden is painted with white track and olive green supports; a similar – if not the same – colour scheme as the nearby Big Loop, Bobbahn bobsled coaster, and Flug der Dämonen. People often think that Toxic Garden and Big Loop are one long roller coaster due to their colour schemes, similar Vekoma make, and the similar locations.

References

External links
 Official Limit page on the Heide Park web-site.
 Suspended Looping Coaster Information on Vekoma website

Heide Park
Vekoma
Roller coasters introduced in 1999